Kevin Jonathan Dallman (born February 26, 1981) is a former Canadian-Kazakhstani professional ice hockey defenceman. He most recently played for Barys Astana of the Kontinental Hockey League (KHL).

Playing career
As a youth, Dallman played in the 1995 Quebec International Pee-Wee Hockey Tournament with a minor ice hockey team from Niagara Falls, Ontario.

Undrafted, Dallman signed his first professional contract with the Boston Bruins on July 18, 2002 after a successful junior career with Guelph Storm of the Ontario Hockey League. After spending three years with Boston's AHL affiliate the Providence Bruins, Dallman made his debut for the Bruins in the 2005–06 season.

Dallman played 21 games for the Bruins before he was claimed off waivers by the St. Louis Blues on December 5, 2005. After a solid performance with the Blues, Dallman signed as a free agent for the Los Angeles Kings to a two-year contract on July 10, 2006.

After two years in the Kings organization Dallman left for Europe, signing with Barys Astana of the newly formed Kontinental Hockey League on July 24, 2008. He became an offensive leader with Barys Astana, leading the KHL in scoring among defenseman with 28 goals and 30 assists for 58 points in 53 games.

Dallman became a Kazakhstani citizen in 2010 and joined the national team. His first IIHF tournament for Kazakhstan was the final Olympic qualifying tournament in Riga.

On May 18, 2012 Barys Astana team managers refused to extend Dallman's contract. "We have agreed with his agent that if the team fulfills its task and reaches the final of the tournament, we will return to discussing the contract's extension. However the team did not reach the final and Dallman did not show his best skills in the playoffs. The issue in question was whether to extend his contract or not. Dallman asked for a four-year extension with significant compensation demands. That is why the decision was made not to extend the contract," Barys president Nurlan Orazbayev said. Dallman signed a two-year contract with SKA Saint Petersburg on May 31, 2012. In May 2014 he returned to Barys Astana, signing a three-year contract.

On August 5th 2019, Dallman announced retirement from the KHL after 11 years in the KHL.

Personal
His uncle, Marty Dallman, played six games for the Toronto Maple Leafs in the late 1980s and played for Austria at the 1994 Winter Olympics.

Career statistics

Regular season and playoffs

International

References

External links

1981 births
Living people
Barys Astana captains
Barys Nur-Sultan players
Boston Bruins players
Canadian ice hockey defencemen
Guelph Storm players
Ice hockey people from Ontario
Kazakhstani ice hockey players
Sportspeople from Niagara Falls, Ontario
Los Angeles Kings players
Manchester Monarchs (AHL) players
Providence Bruins players
St. Louis Blues players
SKA Saint Petersburg players
Undrafted National Hockey League players
Canadian expatriate ice hockey players in Russia